Mattix Corner is an unincorporated community in Clinton County, Indiana, in the United States.

History
Mattix Corner was founded in 1839.

References

Unincorporated communities in Clinton County, Indiana
Unincorporated communities in Indiana